Pilani Assembly constituency is one of the constituencies of Rajasthan Legislative Assembly, and is a segment of Jhunjhunu (Lok Sabha constituency).

Pilani Constituency covers all voters from parts of Chirawa tehsil, which include ILRC Pilani including Pilani Municipal Board and Vidhya Vihar Municipal Board, ILRC Chirawa including Chirawa Municipal Board, ILRC Mandrela and Adooka, Farat and Sehi Kalan of ILRC Surajgarh.

References

See also 
 Member of the Legislative Assembly (India)

Jhunjhunu district
Assembly constituencies of Rajasthan